Hélder da Graça Costa Neto (born 5 September 1982) is an Angolan footballer who plays as a forward.

External links

1982 births
Living people
Angolan footballers
Association football forwards
C.D. Aves players
C.D. Trofense players
F.C. Famalicão players
Doxa Katokopias FC players
AC Vila Meã players
Liga Portugal 2 players
Cypriot First Division players
Angolan expatriate footballers
Expatriate footballers in Portugal
Expatriate footballers in Cyprus